Ilanga kilburni is a species of sea snail, a marine gastropod mollusk in the family Solariellidae.

Description
The diameter of the shell attains 14 mm.

Distribution
This marine species occurs off Transkei to the Eastern Cape Province, South Africa

References

External links
 To World Register of Marine Species

kilburni
Gastropods described in 1987